Stellate cells or star shaped cells forms several places in the body.

 Stellate cells, found in layer I, II, and IV in cortical tissue
 Hepatic stellate cell, pericytes found in the perisinusoidal space of the liver.
 Pancreatic stellate cell, reside in exocrine areas of the pancreas
 Podocyte, found in the Bowman's capsule in the kidneys
 Osteocyte, commonly found cell in mature bone tissue]